Doonside is a small coastal resort town on the KwaZulu-Natal South Coast some 30 km south-west of Durban in KwaZulu-Natal, South Africa, between Amanzimtoti and Illovo Beach. It is a part of the eThekwini metropolitan municipality.

At first the siding was called Middleton, after its builder, but to avoid confusion with Middleton in the Cape the name was changed in 1910 to Doonside, after a house called Lorna Doone which overlooked the siding.

Geography

Doonside along with the inner suburb of Doonheights and other seaside villages are all considered suburbs of Kingsburgh.

Transport
The N2 highway runs west of the town to Durban in the north and Port Shepstone in the south. It is also served by Metrorail KwaZulu-Natal's suburban trains to Durban and Kelso.

References

Populated places in eThekwini Metropolitan Municipality